Voskresenye is a rural locality (a village) in Nagornoye Rural Settlement, Petushinsky District, Vladimir Oblast, Russia. The population was 8 as of 2010. There are 5 streets.

Geography 
Voskresenye is located 29 km northwest of Petushki (the district's administrative centre) by road. Zheludyevo is the nearest rural locality.

References 

Rural localities in Petushinsky District